Cazuelita is a small casserole made of a mixture of corn dough (same paste used for corn tortilla) and mashed potatoes that is used as a side dish or as an appetizer of Mexican cuisine. These small casseroles are molded by hand and the fried in oil or lard. They have enough space to contain different types of fillings like salsas, refried beans or stews.

References 
 Muñoz Zurita, Ricardo. Small Larousee of Mexican Cuisine. (2013). 
 Gaviria, Jorge. Masa: Techniques, Recipes, and Reflections on a Timeless Staple (2022).

External links 
Photograph of cazuelitas
Recipe video

Mexican cuisine